Blastomyces cerolytica is a species of yeast-like fungus. It was discovered and named by Mahmoud K.S. Muftić, and published in 1957.

References

External links

Fungi described in 1957
Ascomycota enigmatic taxa